MIKE SHE is an integrated hydrological modelling system for building and simulating surface water flow and groundwater flow.  MIKE SHE can simulate the entire land phase of the hydrologic cycle and allows components to be used independently and customized to local needs.  MIKE SHE emerged from Système Hydrologique Européen (SHE) as developed and extensively applied since 1977 onwards by a consortium of three European organizations: the Institute of Hydrology (the United Kingdom), SOGREAH (France) and DHI (Denmark).  Since then, DHI has continuously invested resources into research and development of MIKE SHE.  MIKE SHE can be used for the analysis, planning and management of a wide range of water resources and environmental problems related to surface water and groundwater, especially surface-water impact from groundwater withdrawal, conjunctive use of groundwater and surface water, wetland management and restoration, river basin management and planning, impact studies for changes in land use and climate.

The program is offered in both 32-bit and 64-bit versions for Microsoft Windows operating systems.

Other commonly used groundwater simulators 
 FEFLOW
 MODFLOW
 HydroGeoSphere

See also
Hydrological transport model

References

External links 
 DHI Water.Environment.Health

Integrated hydrologic modelling
Hydraulic engineering
Environmental engineering
Physical geography